Ágúst Beinteinn Árnason, aka Gústi B (born 12 December 2001), is an Icelandic actor, radio host and internet personality.

Biography 
He began his career at a young age performing in theaters such as Reykjavík City Theatre, National Theatre of Iceland, and Gaflaraleikhúsið.

Gústi has appeared in films and series, including "The Lava Field," "Cubs," and the polish movie "Wolka."

Gústi is also the Icelandic voice of several cartoon characters in series like "Denver, the last Dinasour" and "Monchhichis," and was the lead in the radio drama "Mio, my son."

In 2021, Gústi gained nationwide attention for keeping a fox as a pet, which he showcased through several social media videos, including walking the fox through downtown Reykjavík.

In 2022, Gústi became Iceland's youngest radio host, signing to the hit music station FM957.

References 

2001 births
Living people
21st-century Icelandic male actors
Icelandic male stage actors
Icelandic radio personalities